Kreiner is a surname. Notable people with the surname include:

David Kreiner (born 1981), Austrian Nordic combined skier
Josef Kreiner (born 1940), Austrian Japanology ethnologist
Kathy Kreiner (born 1957), Canadian alpine skier
Kim Kreiner (born 1977), American javelin thrower
Laurie Kreiner (born 1954), Canadian alpine skier
Marion Kreiner (born 1981), Austrian snowboarder
Stefan Kreiner (born 1973), Austrian Nordic combined skier
Tamás Kreiner, Hungarian composer

Fictional characters:
Fitz Kreiner, character in the Doctor Who novel series Eighth Doctor Adventures